

A-F
List of places in Colorado A through F

G

H

I

J

K

L

M

N

O

P-Z
List of places in Colorado P through Z

References